In the mathematical study of Lie algebras and Lie groups, a Satake diagram is a generalization of a Dynkin diagram introduced by  whose configurations classify simple Lie algebras over the field of real numbers. The Satake diagrams associated to a Dynkin diagram classify real forms of the complex Lie algebra corresponding to the Dynkin diagram.

Satake diagrams are not the same as Vogan diagrams of a Lie group, although they look similar.

Definition 

A Satake diagram is obtained from a Dynkin diagram by blackening some vertices, and connecting other vertices in pairs by arrows, according to certain rules.

Suppose that G is an algebraic group defined over a field k, such as the reals. We let S be a maximal split torus in G, and take T to be a maximal torus containing S defined over the separable algebraic closure K of k. Then G(K) has a Dynkin diagram with respect to some choice of positive roots of T. This Dynkin diagram has a natural action of the Galois group of K/k. Also some of the simple roots vanish on S. The Satake–Tits diagram is given by the Dynkin diagram D, together with the action of the Galois group, with the simple roots vanishing on S colored black. In the case when k is the field of real numbers, the absolute Galois group has order 2, and its action on D is represented by drawing conjugate points of the Dynkin diagram near each other, and the Satake–Tits diagram is called a Satake diagram.

Examples 

 Compact Lie algebras correspond to the Satake diagram with all vertices blackened.
 Split Lie algebras correspond to the Satake diagram with only white (i.e., non blackened) and unpaired vertices.

Differences between Satake and Vogan diagrams 
Both Satake and Vogan diagrams are used to classify semisimple Lie groups or algebras (or algebraic groups) over the reals and both consist of Dynkin diagrams enriched by blackening a subset of the nodes and connecting some pairs of vertices by arrows.  Satake diagrams, however, can be generalized to any field (see above) and fall under the general paradigm of Galois cohomology, whereas Vogan diagrams are defined specifically over the reals.  Generally speaking, the structure of a real semisimple Lie algebra is encoded in a more transparent way in its Satake diagram, but Vogan diagrams are simpler to classify.

The unadorned Dynkin diagram (i.e., that with only white nodes and no arrows), when interpreted as a Satake diagram, represents the split real form of the Lie algebra, whereas it represents the compact form when interpreted as a Vogan diagram.

See also 
Relative root system
List of irreducible Tits indices

References 
 
 
 

Lie algebras